David Stoten (born in Luton, Bedfordshire) is a short film maker and director and caricaturist on TV's Spitting Image. Stoten won the BAFTA award with longtime collaborator, Tim Watts in 1994 for The Big Story.

Since then, Stoten has provided storyboards for, amongst others, Corpse Bride, Mr. Bean's Holiday and the TV series Charlie and Lola.

Credited as one of the "Spitting Image team" (under Roger Law), Stoten provided the cover to 2007's QI "E" Annual, as well as contributing incidental illustrations.  Stoten has been an ongoing contributor to The Oldie. In 2015, Stoten provided caricatures for the ITV show Newzoids.

As a sculptor, Stoten has made maquettes for the animation film industry whilst also sculpting a range of Gorillaz figures for the designer toy company Kidrobot.

Stoten was Head of Story for the animated Feature Film Gnomeo and Juliet and subsequently became the Creative Development Lead at Arc Productions in Toronto.

He directed the DVD Specials Thomas & Friends and was the head writer for Steam Team to the Rescue and the twenty-fourth (and final) series succeeding Andrew Brenner.

References

External links

Official Arc Productions bio

Living people
English film directors
Year of birth missing (living people)
English caricaturists
British storyboard artists
English animators
British animated film directors
Spitting Image